Karl Malden (born Mladen George Sekulovich; March 22, 1912 – July 1, 2009) was an American actor. He was primarily a character actor, who according to Robert Berkvist, "for more than 60 years brought an intelligent intensity and a homespun authenticity to roles in theater, film, and television", especially in such classic films as A Streetcar Named Desire (1951), for which he won the Academy Award for Best Supporting Actor, On the Waterfront (1954), Pollyanna (1960), and One-Eyed Jacks (1961). Malden also played in high-profile Hollywood films such as Baby Doll (1956), The Hanging Tree (1959), How the West Was Won (1962), Gypsy (1962), and Patton (1970).

From 1972 to 1977, he portrayed Lt. Mike Stone in the primetime television crime drama The Streets of San Francisco. He was later the spokesman for American Express. Film and culture critic Charles Champlin described Malden as "an Everyman, but one whose range moved easily up and down the levels of society and the IQ scale, from heroes to heavies and ordinary, decent guys just trying to get along", and at the time of his death, Malden was described as "one of the great character actors of his time" who created a number of "powerhouse performances on screen". Malden was also president of the Academy of Motion Picture Arts and Sciences from 1989 to 1992.

Early life
Karl Malden, the eldest of three sons, was born Mladen Sekulovich in Chicago, Illinois, on March 22, 1912, which was his mother's 20th birthday. He was raised in a home at 457 Connecticut Street in Gary, Indiana.

His Bosnian Serb father Petar Sekulović (1886–1975) worked in the steel mills and as a milkman, and his mother, Minnie Sekulovich (March 22, 1892 – July 15, 1995), was a Czech seamstress and actress. The Sekulovich family's roots trace back to Podosoje near Bileća, Bosnia and Herzegovina. Malden spoke only Serbian until he was in kindergarten; he remained fluent in the language until his death. Malden's father, who had a passion for music, organized the Serbian Singing Federation, uniting immigrant choral groups across the United States.

As a teenager, Malden joined the Karađorđe Choir at Saint Sava Serbian Orthodox Church, where his father produced plays and taught acting. He took part in many of these plays, which included a version of Jack and the Beanstalk, but mostly centered on the community's Serbian heritage. In high school, he was a popular student and the star of the basketball team (according to his autobiography, Malden broke his nose twice while playing, taking elbows to the face and resulting in his trademark bulbous nose).

He participated in the drama department and was narrowly elected senior class president. Among other roles, he played Pooh-Bah in The Mikado. After graduating from Emerson High School in 1931 with high marks, he briefly planned to leave Gary for Arkansas, where he hoped to win an athletic scholarship, but college officials did not admit him owing to his refusal to play any sport besides basketball. From 1931 until 1934, he worked in the steel mills, as had his father.

He changed his name from Mladen Sekulovich to Karl Malden at age 22, something director Elia Kazan urged him to do. He anglicized his first name by swapping its letters "l" and "a" and used it as his last and taking his grandfather's first name as his own. This was because the first theatre company he was in wanted him to shorten his name for its marquee. He thought that they wanted to fire him and were using his name as an excuse; although that was not the case, he still changed his name to give them no excuse.

Malden later stated that he regretted changing his name and tried to insert the name Sekulovich wherever possible in his work. For example, as General Omar Bradley in Patton, as his troops slog their way through enemy fire in Sicily, Malden says "Hand me that helmet, Sekulovich" to another soldier. In Dead Ringer, as a police detective in the squad room, Malden tells another detective: "Sekulovich, gimme my hat." In Fear Strikes Out, Malden, playing Jimmy Piersall's father John, introduces Jimmy to a baseball scout named Sekulovich. In Birdman of Alcatraz, as a prison warden touring the cell block, Malden recites a list of inmates' names, including Sekulovich (Malden's father was not pleased, as he told his son "Mladen, no Sekulovich has ever been in prison!"). In On the Waterfront, in which Malden plays the priest, among the names of the officers of Local 374 called out in the courtroom scene is Mladen Sekulovich, Delegate (played by Fred Gwynne).  Perhaps the most notable usage of his real name, however, was in the television series The Streets of San Francisco, where Malden's character, Mike Stone, employed a legman (played by Art Passarella) with that name.

Education and early stage work
In September 1934, Malden left Gary, Indiana, to pursue formal dramatic training at the Goodman School (later part of DePaul University), then associated with the Goodman Theater in Chicago. Although he had worked in the steel mills in Gary for three years, he had helped support his family and was consequently unable to save enough money to pay for his schooling. Making a deal with the director of the program, he gave the institute the little money that he did have, with the director agreeing that, if Malden did well, he would be rewarded with a full scholarship. He won the scholarship.

When Malden performed in the Goodman's children's theater, he wooed actress Mona Greenberg (stage name: Mona Graham), who married him in 1938. He graduated from the Chicago Art Institute in 1937. Soon after, without work or money, Malden returned to his hometown.

Acting career around World War II
He eventually traveled to New York City, and first appeared as an actor on Broadway in 1937. He did some radio work and in a small role made his film debut in They Knew What They Wanted.

Malden also joined the Group Theatre, where he began acting in many plays and was introduced to a young Elia Kazan, who later worked with him on A Streetcar Named Desire (1951) and On the Waterfront (1954).

His acting career was interrupted in 1942 by the Second World War, during which he served as a noncommissioned officer in the 8th Air Force of the United States Army Air Corps. While in the service, he was given a small role in the United States Army Air Forces play and film Winged Victory. Malden was discharged in 1946 as a Sergeant and was awarded the Air Force Presidential Unit Citation, the American Campaign Medal and the World War II Victory Medal.

After the war, Malden resumed his acting career on Broadway, playing yet another small supporting role in the short-lived Maxwell Anderson play Truckline Cafe (1946), with a then-unknown Marlon Brando. The next year, director Elia Kazan gave Malden a co-starring role in Arthur Miller's breakout play All My Sons. By the end of that year he had joined the legendary original cast of Tennessee Williams's landmark drama A Streetcar Named Desire, also directed by Kazan, playing Harold "Mitch" Mitchell. With that high-profile theatre success, he then crossed over into steady film work.

Film career: 1950s to 1970s
Malden appeared in a small role in the film noir Kiss of Death (1947) during the run of All My Sons, but didn't resume his film acting career until 1950, starting with The Gunfighter and Where the Sidewalk Ends, then and Halls of Montezuma (1951). For Kazan's film version of A Streetcar Named Desire (also 1951), he recreated his role as Harold "Mitch" Mitchell, Stanley Kowalski's best friend, who starts a romance with Blanche DuBois (Vivien Leigh). For this performance, he won the Academy Award for Best Supporting Actor. His other films during this period included Alfred Hitchcock's I Confess (1953) with Montgomery Clift and Anne Baxter, and On the Waterfront (1954) — where he received his second nomination for the Academy Award for Best Supporting Actor — playing a priest who influences Terry Malloy (Marlon Brando) to testify against mobster-union boss Johnny Friendly (Lee J. Cobb).

Baby Doll (1956) had Malden playing a man frustrated by a teenaged wife. The film was condemned by the Legion of Decency and did not air long. He starred in dozens of films from the late 1950s to the early 1970s, such as Fear Strikes Out and Time Limit (both 1957). The latter picture was Malden's only directing credit of a film, but when Delmer Daves was taken ill during the shooting of The Hanging Tree (1959), Malden took over direction of the movie for two weeks — Pollyanna (1960), appeared in Marlon Brando's directed film entitled One-Eyed Jacks (1961), Birdman of Alcatraz, Gypsy, How the West Was Won (all 1962), The Cincinnati Kid (1965), and Patton (1970), playing General Omar Bradley.

Malden's wife, Mona (the former Mildred Greenberg), graduated from Roosevelt High School in Emporia, Kansas, where she attended Kansas State Teachers College, now Emporia State University. He first visited the campus with her in 1959, and was impressed by the ESU Summer Theatre. He returned in the summer of 1964 to teach, working with the actors in the company. Upon leaving, he gave his honorarium to establish the Karl Malden Theater Scholarship still given today.

In 1963, he was a member of the jury at the 13th Berlin International Film Festival.

Television work

The Streets of San Francisco (1972–1977)
In 1972, Malden was approached by producer Quinn Martin about starring as Lt. Mike Stone in The Streets of San Francisco. Although the concept originated as a made-for-television movie, ABC quickly signed on to carry it as a series. Martin hired Michael Douglas to play Lt. Stone's young partner, Inspector Steve Keller.

Malden's character Stone was a widowed veteran cop with more than 20 years of experience, who is paired with Keller, an officer recently graduated from college. During its first season, The Streets of San Francisco was a ratings winner among many other 1970s crime dramas, and served as ABC's answer to such shows as Hawaii Five-O, Adam-12, Ironside, Barnaby Jones, Kojak, McMillan & Wife, Police Woman, The Rockford Files, and Switch.

For his work as Lt. Stone, Malden was nominated for a Primetime Emmy Award for Outstanding Lead Actor in a Drama Series four times between 1974 and 1977, but never won. After two episodes in the fifth season, Douglas left the show to act in movies; Douglas had also produced the film One Flew Over the Cuckoo's Nest in 1975. Lt. Stone's new partner was Inspector Dan Robbins, played by Richard Hatch. The show took a ratings nosedive after being rescheduled against another Quinn Martin series on CBS, Barnaby Jones, and ABC cancelled the series after five seasons and 120 episodes.

Later TV roles

In 1980, Malden starred in Skag, an hour-long drama that focused on the life of a foreman at a Pittsburgh steel mill. Malden described his character, Pete Skagska, as a simple man trying to keep his family together. The pilot episode for the series had Skag temporarily disabled by a stroke, and explored the effects it had on his family and co-workers. While Skag met with poor ratings, critics praised it; the series was cancelled after six episodes.

In 1981, Malden portrayed ice hockey coach Herb Brooks in a made for television account of the United States men's national ice hockey team's miraculous gold medal-winning run in the 1980 Winter Olympics. Malden told Sports Illustrated in December 1980 that he had never actually met Herb Brooks in preparation for his portrayal of him, but he studied him on videotape, especially his eyes. Malden said of Brooks "I'd hate to meet him in a dark alley. I think he's a little on the neurotic side. Maybe more than a little. Any moment you think he's going to jump out of his skin." Malden also remarked with disapproval that Brooks could've ventured an occasional smile during one of the less intense games. Malden also wondered how, after working hard over the course of seven months that Brooks could have simply walked away after his team clinched the improbable victory against the Soviet team.
 
In 1987, Malden was the host/narrator for the second and third television specials that later became the long-running series Unsolved Mysteries.

Malden portrayed Leon Klinghoffer in the 1989 TV movie The Hijacking of the Achille Lauro, the only person to die in the 1985 terrorist incident.

His last acting role was in 2000 in the first-season episode of The West Wing titled "Take This Sabbath Day" in which he portrayed a Catholic priest, and used the same Bible he had used in On the Waterfront.

Other work
Malden delivered the line "Don't leave home without them!" in a series of U.S. television commercials for American Express traveler's cheques in the 1970s and 1980s. He also advertised the American Express card, with the famous opening line, "Do you know me?" These ads were occasionally spoofed on The Tonight Show Starring Johnny Carson.

From 1990 to 2009, Malden was a member of The United States Postal Service's Citizens' Stamp Advisory Committee (CSAC) which evaluates potential subjects for U.S. postage stamps and reports its recommendations to the Postmaster General.

Personal life
On December 18, 1938, Malden married Mona Greenberg (May 9, 1917 – July 13, 2019), who survived him. Their marriage was one of the longest in Hollywood's history, with their 70th wedding anniversary occurring in December 2008. In addition to his wife, Malden was survived by his daughters Mila and Carla, and his son-in-law Tom. His other son-in-law Laurence predeceased him in 2007.  Malden's mother lived to 103 years of age.

In 1997, Malden published his autobiography, When Do I Start?, written with his daughter Carla.

Death

Malden died at his home in Los Angeles on July 1, 2009, at the age of 97.  He was reported to have been in poor health for several years. He was buried at the Westwood Village Memorial Park Cemetery in Los Angeles.

Malden's friend and former co-star Michael Douglas wrote a tribute to Malden for Time "Milestones" section.

Awards and recognition
Malden won the 1951 Academy Award for Best Supporting Actor for A Streetcar Named Desire and was nominated in 1954 for his supporting role in On the Waterfront. Malden was a past president of the Academy of Motion Picture Arts and Sciences. In October 2003, he was named the 40th recipient of the Screen Actors' Guild's Life Achievement Award for career achievement and humanitarian accomplishment.

In 1985, he was awarded an Emmy Award for Outstanding Supporting Actor in a Limited Series for his performance as Freddy Kassab in Fatal Vision. The same year, he was also awarded an honorary doctoral degree in fine arts by Emporia State University.

In May 2001, Malden received an honorary degree, doctor of humane letters, from Valparaiso University. Michael Douglas presented Malden with a lifetime achievement award from the Screen Actors Guild on February 22, 2004. On November 11, 2004, Douglas also presented Malden with the Monte Cristo Award of the Eugene O'Neill Theater Center in Waterford, Connecticut, which is given for "distinguished careers exemplifying Eugene O'Neill's standard of excellence and pioneering spirit." Among other past winners were Jason Robards, Zoe Caldwell, Edward Albee, August Wilson, and Brian Dennehy.

On November 12, 2005, the United States House of Representatives authorized the United States Postal Service to rename the Los Angeles Barrington Postal Station as the Karl Malden Postal Station in honor of Malden's achievements. The bill, H.R. 3667, was sponsored by Representatives Henry Waxman and Diane Watson.

For his contribution to the film industry, Malden has a star on the Hollywood Walk of Fame at 6231 Hollywood Blvd. In 2005, he was inducted into the Western Performers Hall of Fame at the National Cowboy & Western Heritage Museum in Oklahoma City, Oklahoma. In November 2018, a monument to Karl Malden was revealed in Belgrade, Serbia.

Decorations

Filmography

Films

Television

Radio appearances

References

Sources

External links

 
 

1912 births
2009 deaths
20th-century American male actors
American male film actors
American male stage actors
American male television actors
American people of Bosnia and Herzegovina descent
American people of Czech descent
American people of Serbian descent
American television personalities
Best Supporting Actor Academy Award winners
Burials at Westwood Village Memorial Park Cemetery
DePaul University alumni
Donaldson Award winners
Male Western (genre) film actors
Male actors from Chicago
Male actors from Indiana
Outstanding Performance by a Supporting Actor in a Miniseries or Movie Primetime Emmy Award winners
People from Gary, Indiana
Presidents of the Academy of Motion Picture Arts and Sciences
Recipients of the Order of St. Sava
United States Army Air Forces personnel of World War II
United States Army Air Forces soldiers
Valparaiso University people